Isaac Caldwell (1795 – January 12, 1836) was a justice of the Supreme Court of Mississippi from 1825 to 1826.

Born in Clinton, Mississippi, Caldwell became well-known as an attorney. In 1829, Caldwell fought a duel with state legislator John R. Peyton over the latter's vote preventing Caldwell's hometown from being named capital of Mississippi; neither participant was injured. Caldwell was the law partner of Senator George Poindexter, and following Poindexter's defeat in his 1836 bid for reelection, Caldwell ended up engaging in a duel with one of Poindexter's political opponents, Colonel Samuel Gwin. The parties fought with pistols, and "[b]oth parties fell. Caldwell expired in two hours. Gwin was shot through the lungs and survived about a year".

See also
List of justices of the Supreme Court of Mississippi

References

1795 births
1836 deaths
People from Clinton, Mississippi
Justices of the Mississippi Supreme Court
Deaths by firearm
American politicians killed in duels